Rotrou may refer to:

Rotrou I, Count of Perche
Rotrou II, Count of Perche
Rotrou III, Count of Perche (bef. 1080 – 1144)
Rotrou IV, Count of Perche
Rotrou (Archbishop of Rouen) (1109 – 1183/84)
Jean Rotrou (1609 - 1650), French poet and playwright